Drem (Scottish Gaelic: Druim) is a small village in East Lothian, Scotland.

It is approximately 20 miles east of Edinburgh and is close to Haddington (to the south), North Berwick (northeast), Dirleton (north) and Gullane (north west). 
It has a railway station on the Edinburgh to North Berwick line with hourly service between those points and occasional service to Glasgow. The station is the last before the single track North Berwick line branches off the East Coast Main Line.

During World War II, the former West Fenton Aerodrome (later Gullane Aerodrome) became RAF Drem and the Drem Lighting System was developed to assist Spitfire landing. The disused airfield buildings were used to construct component parts of the Forth Road Bridge.

Today some of the outbuildings have become part of the Fenton Barns retail and leisure village and are used as studios by local craftspeople, particularly furniture makers.

Chesters Hill Fort, one mile south of the village, is an example of an Iron Age fort.

See also
List of places in East Lothian

References

External links

Census data 2001

Villages in East Lothian